Francisco Argemí (24 March 1901 – 28 July 1971) was a Spanish field hockey player. He competed in the men's tournament at the 1928 Summer Olympics.

References

External links
 

1901 births
1971 deaths
Spanish male field hockey players
Olympic field hockey players of Spain
Field hockey players at the 1928 Summer Olympics
Place of birth missing